Sopelovka is a rural locality (a village) in Kolpakovsky Selsoviet Rural Settlement, Kurchatovsky District, Kursk Oblast, Russia. Population:

Geography 
The village is located in the Reut River basin, 48 km south-west of Kursk, 14 km south-west of the district center – the town Kurchatov, 5.5 km from the selsoviet center – Novosergeyevka.

 Climate
Sopelovka has a warm-summer humid continental climate (Dfb in the Köppen climate classification).

Transport 

The rural locality is situated 55 km from Kursk Vostochny Airport, 122 km from Belgorod International Airport and 254 km from Voronezh Peter the Great Airport.

References

Notes

Sources

Rural localities in Kurchatovsky District, Kursk Oblast